Sparx* is a French-Vietnamese 3D art, VFX and animation studio, with around 400 artists, animators and technical experts. The French offices closed in 2008, while the American and Vietnamese offices closed in 2010.

Since 2011, Sparx* has been a member of Virtuos Group - one of the world's largest game developers. It was reopened in Ho Chi Minh City in 2011.

For over two decades, the studio, based in Ho Chi Minh City, has been working with different digital entertainment publishers in the movie and game industries, and has also contributed to AAA video games, Hollywood movies, and TV series across the globe.

History 
Sparx* was previously known as Sparx* Animation Studios.

Founded in 1995 and opened in 2002, by Jean-Christophe Bernard, Guillaume Hellouin and Fabrice Giger, Sparx* first made its mark co-producing TV series that were aired in multiple countries across five continents, and became well known for co-producing Rolie Polie Olie with Nelvana and Disney Channel which won a Daytime Emmy Award and another Gemini Award for ‘Outstanding Special Class Animated Program’.

The company produced the fully computer-animated movie Igor, starring John Cusack and Molly Shannon which was released on September 19, 2008. Their animation department reached new milestones years later by taking part in the full-episode production for the last 3 seasons of Star Wars Rebels - the award-winning TV series from Lucasfilm.

Sparx* temporarily closed its French office in 2008, and American and Vietnamese offices in 2010. In September 2011, assets and core team of Sparx* in Vietnam were acquired and reopened by Virtuos Holdings Pte. Ltd., one of the largest digital entertainment contents production company headquartered in Singapore with studios in Shanghai, Chengdu, Xian, Paris, Dublin, Montreal, and Los Angeles, and offices in Montréal, Paris, San Francisco, Seoul, Vancouver and Tokyo.

As of 2019, Sparx* has been providing services for video game companies globally. The studio has also contributed to some of Hollywood's cinematic franchises.

Film contributions

Game Contributions

Commercials

References

French animation studios
Television production companies of France
Mass media companies established in 1995
Companies based in Paris
Special effects companies